Asociația Sportivă a Suporterilor FCM 1950 Bacău, commonly known as ASS FCM 1950 Bacău, FCM 1950 Bacău or simply as FCM Bacău, is a Romanian football club based in Bacău, Bacău County. Founded in 1950 as Dinamo Bacău, the club from Moldavia spent 42 seasons in the top-flight of the Romanian football, winning a Romanian League Cup and qualifying for European competitions such as Cup Winners' Cup or Intertoto Cup.

In the early 2010s, the club entered in a shadowy cone, due to the conflict between the team's owner, Dumitru Sechelariu (former mayor of Bacău) and the newly elected mayor, who chose to retire the public financing of the team and to sustain SC Bacău. Health problems and subsequently the premature death of Dumitru Sechelariu in the early 2013 multiplied the existing financial problems of the club, then at the start of the 2013–14 Liga III season, "the Mad Bulls" withdrew from championship and were dissolved.

In 2017, the Supporters Association of FCM Bacău, supported by Sergiu Sechelariu, brother of Dumitru and legal owner of the "FCM 1950 Bacău brand", started a collaboration with Gauss Bacău (former SC Bacău), team also left in the meantime without financing by the municipality, but the collaboration broken in the summer of 2018 and after a year of inactivity, the fans (supported again by Sechelariu's brother) started a new project named ASS FCM 1950 Bacău and enrolled the senior squad in the Liga IV.

History

First years and the best results (1950–1992)

FCM Bacău was established in 1950 as Dinamo Bacău, being under the tutelage of the Ministry of Internal Affairs, as well as other clubs that bore the name "Dinamo". The management of the club from Bacău subsequently decided to separate from the ministry and they renamed it as Sport Club Bacău and added other sports sections such as athletics or tennis.

The first presence in the first league of Romania was during the 1956 season, when, unfortunately at the end, they relegated to the second division. However followed years full of football in the city situated on the banks of Bistrița River, which reached its peak in the 1968–69 edition when it was ranked 5th and qualified for the Fairs Cities' Cup, the precursor of the UEFA Cup and the UEFA Europa League. At that time, Dinamo Bacău had an exceptional generation in which they had names such as: Emerich Dembrovschi, Nicolae Vătafu, Petre Băluță, Artistică Ghiță or Daniel Ene. The opponent in the first round was Floriana F.C., team which Dinamo beat with the score of 6–0, three goals being scored by the greatest scorer and player in the team's history, Emerich Dembrovschi (Hero of Guadalajara, the player who scored against Brazil and Pelé). After a 1–0 in the second match, Dinamo qualified for the second round, where they met Skeid Fotball, which previously had eliminated the well-known West German side 1860 Munich. Băcăuanii qualified again, now after a 2–0 on aggregate and met in the third round the Scottish club Kilmarnock F.C., club that they eliminated after a 3–1 on aggregate, reaching a splendid performance for the Romanian football, the qualification in the quarter-finals of the competition. In the quarter-finals the team from Bacău met the prestigious club Arsenal F.C., club that will eliminate the Romanian side, after that, winning the competition.

After the historical presence in the quarterfinals of the Fairs Cities' Cup, băcăuanii would obtain notable results also in the domestic championship where at the end of the 1972–73 season, SC Bacău (name used by the club between 1970 and 1990) would finish in the 4th place, this being the best ranking in the club's history. Sport Club also managed to make a beautiful figure in the Cupa României, where, after the Romanian Revolution, they managed to reach the final, at the end of the 1990–91 season, but in the final, they lost against Universitatea Craiova, score 1–2. Universitatea Craiova was also the winner of Divizia A in that season, which allowed "the yellow and blues" to qualify for the second and last time in a European competition, the UEFA Cup. FC Bacău was drawn to meet Werder Bremen. Werder was the team that would win the Cup Winners' Cup that year, defeating AS Monaco by 2–0. At that time Werder Bremen was a powerful club, with a cosmopolitan squad, with strong players, both physically and as value. Moreover, a first disproportion was given by the height of the players, the average of the two teams saying that the Germans were 21 inches taller. On the other hand, FC Bacău was the team of nobody, with big financial problems.

Sechelariu's era (1992–2014)

From 1992 to 2006, the team remained in the Divizia A, under the name of Selena, AS and FCM, as it is today. Dumitru Sechelariu was behind everything that happened (good or bad) during this time at FCM Bacău. It was first a period of relative growth, with following rankings: 11th (1995–96), also the season in which AS Bacău won 5–1 on the Steaua Stadium, one of the biggest surprises in the Romanian football), 5th (1996–97), 10th (1997–98), 5th (1998–99), 8th (1999–2000); followed by the relegation that occurred in the summer of 2001, after the relegation play-off against Farul Constanța and the purchase of the place from the newly promoted FC Baia Mare, in the same summer. The 2001–02 season started with great ambitions, with huge investments for a team from Romania, with relatively big names in the squad and on the bench, with the ecstasy of a 4–2 win against Dinamo București and the final disappointments that only brought a 6th place. After 2002, FCM Bacău was only in the lower part of the tables, until finally relegated in the Liga II at the end of the 2005–06 edition. Not infrequently, Sechelariu referred to FCM Bacău calling it "my child", sometimes "dear", sometimes "disabled". The history of the football club from Bacău, between 1992 and 2009 was extraordinarily agitated and followed the contours of its owner faithfully. After all, it was a mixture of will, beauty and bitter disappointment.

In 2006 the Moldavian team relegated to the Liga II, then at the end of the 2006–07 season, the team finished in the 5th place, showing a decline that in the following years would be highlighted more, this period being one of the most negative of the club based in the city of George Bacovia, which at the end of the 2007–08 season was at one step away of being relegated even in the third tier. For the 2009–10 season the team set out as the main target a promotion in the Liga I, but due to financial problems and misunderstandings between Dumitru Sechelariu and the Local Council of the Municipality, FCM ended as being relegated to the Liga III, after two matches lost by forfeit.

After the exclusion from the second league, the Municipality of Bacău registered the team in the next season of the Liga III, under the name of SCM Bacău. On 9 June 2010, it was announced that the new club will be built on the structure of the old club, SC FCM Bacău SA, which after the capital increase came under the control of the Municipality, Dumitru Sechelariu the former owner of the club became a minority shareholder. The new management of the yellow and blues decided to change the name in SC FCM Bacău SA and to release the contracts of the players who came from the former AS FCM Bacău. FCM Bacău promoted in the Liga II in 2011, and in the following season obtained a 7th place. Before the next season, the financial situation no longer allowed the club to keep the contracts of the players, who left the team (the majority leaving for FC Botoșani) and Sechelariu decided to transfer it entirely to the Municipality. At that time, the team was going to be relegated in the third league, and the Municipality decided to stop the investments in this club and to re-direct the public financing to CS Mesagerul Bacău, a team that would receive the name of SC Bacău, also the health problems and subsequently the premature death of Dumitru Sechelariu in early 2013 left no door opened for the existing financial problems of the club, then at the start of the new season, "the Mad Bulls" withdrew from championship and were dissolved.

Supporters, the last hope (2017–2020)
In 2017, the Supporters Association of FCM Bacău, supported by Sergiu Sechelariu, brother of Dumitru and legal owner of the "FCM 1950 Bacău brand", started a collaboration with Gauss Bacău (former SC Bacău), team also left in the meantime without financing by the municipality, but the collaboration has broken in the summer of 2018 and after a year of inactivity, the fans (supported again by Sechelariu's brother) started a new project named ASS FCM 1950 Bacău and enrolled the senior squad in the Liga IV,but the team was again dissolved at the end of the 2019-20 season.

Grounds

Until 1966 FCM Bacău (named Dinamo Bacău) used to play its home matches on Steaua Roșie Stadium, with a capacity of 5,000 people, but moved subsequently on the Municipal Stadium in Bacău, with a capacity of 17,500 seats. Seen as a coquettish stadium of the country, especially during Sechelariu's era, when the owner of the team Dumitru Sechelariu renovated, modernized it and assured the installation of a floodlight system. Between 2001 and 2004, the stadium was named as Dumitru Sechelariu, after the name of the eccentric businessman, mayor of Bacău and owner of FCM. Death of Sechelariu it meant broadly the death of football from Bacău, after FCM, the stadium was also abandoned, being the victim of an unsuccessful modernization project. The stadium which is situated in the center of the city and was only some time ago the home of FCM is now a ruin.

After the re-foundation as ASS FCM Bacău, the club has to play its home matches on Baza Sportivă Nautică Șerbănești, with a capacity of only 200 people.

Support
FCM Bacău has many supporters in Bacău and especially in Bacău County. The ultras groups of FCM Bacău are known as Taurii furioși, Best and Ultra Boys. The three groups merged in 2010 and form FCM 1950 Bacău, group that developed subsequently in an association that managed to bring back to life the club from the city of George Bacovia. In the past were also another ultras groups such as RSB, Prima-Linie or FRT Bacău.

FCM Bacău fans have an intense rivalry with the supporters of Ceahlăul Piatra Neamț, which are known under the name of Urșii carpatini.

Rivalries
The most important rivalry for FCM Bacău is the one against Ceahlăul Piatra Neamț. This match is known as the Derby of Moldavia or Il Classico. Over time, FCM had important rivalries with other teams, such as Steaua București, Dinamo București or Rapid București, as well as some regional ones and even local, for example against SC Bacău.

Honours

Leagues
Liga I
Winners (0):, Best finish: 4th 1972–73

Liga II
Winners (4): 1955, 1966–67, 1974–75, 1994–95
Runners-up (3): 1954, 1957–58, 1964–65

Liga III
Winners (1): 2010–11

Liga IV – Bacău County
Runners-up (1): 2019–20

Cups
Cupa României
Winners (0):
Runners-up (1): 1990–91

Cupa Ligii:
Winners (1): 1998

European record

Records and statistics

Biggest victories and defeats
'

Biggest Home Win:
6–0 vs. Universitatea Craiova, 7 December 1988
Biggest Home Loss:
0–8 vs. Steaua București, 6 May 1956
Biggest Away Win:
4–0 vs. Bihor Oradea, 18 October 1969
5–1 vs. Steaua București, 17 August 1996
Biggest Away Loss:
0–8 vs. Steaua București, 30 November 1969
Highest Scoring:
6–4 vs. Sportul Studențesc București, 27 November 1988
3–7 vs. Dinamo București, 19 September 2003

Highest Scoring Draw:
4–4 vs. Steaua București, 20 October 1979
Most Goals Scoring While Losing:
3–4 vs. Progresul București, 9 June 1963
3–4 vs. Universitatea Craiova, 11 November 1973
3–4 vs. Jiul Petroșani, 18 September 1982
3–4 vs. Argeș Pitești, 30 March 1986
3–5 vs. Sportul Studențesc București, 25 June 1987
3–5 vs. Victoria București, 9 October 1988
3–5 vs. Bihor Oradea, 17 September 1989
3–4 vs. Steaua București, 7 August 2000
3–7 vs. Dinamo București, 19 September 2003

Longest Streaks
'

Wins and Losses

Longest Winning Streak (5):
 From Round 19 of 1962–63 to Round 23 of 1962–63
Longest Unbeaten Streak (14):
 From Round 34 of 1997–98 to Round 13 of 1998–99
Longest Drawing Streak (8):
 From Round 7 of 1979–80 to Round 14 of 1979–80
Longest Not Drawing Streak (39):
 From Round 33 of 1992–93 to Round 3 of 1996–97
Longest Winless Streak (15):
 From Round 16 of 2005–06 to Round 30 of 2005–06
Longest Losing Streak (13):
 From Round 17 of 2005–06 to Round 29 of 2005–06

Longest Home Winning Streak (13):
 From Round 3 of 1968–69 to Round 28 of 1968–69
Longest Home Unbeaten Streak (43):
 From Round 20 of 1967–68 to Round 18 of 1970–71
Longest Home Drawing Streak (4):
 From Round 7 of 1979–80 to Round 14 of 1979–80
Longest Home Not Drawing Streak (19):
 From Round 34 of 1992–93 to Round 2 of 1996–97
Longest Home Winless Streak (7):
 From Round 16 of 2005–06 to Round 29 of 2005–06
Longest Home Losing Streak (6):
 From Round 18 of 2005–06 to Round 29 of 2005–06

Longest Away Winning Streak (3):
 From Round 20 of 1962–63 to Round 25 of 1962–63
Longest Away Unbeaten Streak (6):
 From Round 1 of 1998–99 to Round 12 of 1998–99
Longest Away Drawing Streak (4):
 From Round 8 of 1979–80 to Round 13 of 1979–80
Longest Away Not Drawing Streak (29):
 From Round 20 of 1961–62 to Round 21 of 1967–68
Longest Away Winless Streak (45):
 From Round 2 of 2003–04 to Round 30 of 2005–06
Longest Away Losing Streak (14):
 From Round 27 of 1969–70 to Round 22 of 1970–71

Scoring and Conceding

Longest Scoring Streak (10):
 From Round 16 of 1960–61 to Round 25 of 1960–61
 From Round 33 of 1981–82 to Round 8 of 1982–83
 From Round 31 of 1997–98 to Round 6 of 1998–99
Longest Clean Sheets Streak (5):
 From Round 9 of 2002–03 to Round 13 of 2002–03
Longest Scoreless Streak (6):
 From Round 9 of 1997–98 to Round 14 of 1997–98
Longest Conceding Streak (25):
 From Round 5 of 2005–06 to Round 29 of 2005–06

Longest Home Scoring Streak (26):
 From Round 23 of 1995–96 to Round 3 of 1997–98
Longest Home Clean Sheets Streak (9):
 From Round 26 of 1969–70 to Round 14 of 1970–71
 From Round 18 of 1984–85 to Round 33 of 1984–85
Longest Home Scoreless Streak (4):
 From Round 19 of 2003–04 to Round 25 of 2003–04
Longest Home Conceding Streak (13):
 From Round 6 of 2005–06 to Round 29 of 2005–06

Longest Away Scoring Streak (7):
 From Round 26 of 1997–98 to Round 5 of 1998–99
Longest Away Clean Sheets Streak (3):
 From Round 15 of 1960–61 to Round 18 of 1960–61
 From Round 24 of 1968–69 to Round 27 of 1968–69
 From Round 28 of 2002–03 to Round 2 of 2003–04
Longest Away Scoreless Streak (9):
 From Round 28 of 1991–92 to Round 9 of 1992–93
Longest Away Conceding Streak (31):
 From Round 22 of 1983–84 to Round 15 of 1985–86

League history

Notable former players
The footballers enlisted below have had international cap(s) for their respective countries at junior and/or senior level and/or more than 100 caps for FCM Bacău.

Romania
  Vasile Alexandru
  Florian Ambru
  Ștefan Apostol
  Vasile Ardeleanu
  Sorin Avram
  Eugen Baciu
  Dragu Bădin
  Valentin Bădoi
  Daniel Bogdan
  Radu Ciobanu
  Cristian Ciocoiu
  Corneliu Codreanu
  Narcis Coman
  Mircea Constantinescu
  Andrei Cristea
  Marius Croitoru
  Cătălin Cursaru
  Daniel David
  Emerich Dembrovschi
  Marius Doboș
  Gheorghe Ene
  Florin Ganea
  Dudu Georgescu
  Dorin Goian
  Viorel Ignătescu
  Silviu Iorgulescu
  Vasile Jercălău
  Ionuț Mihălăchioaie
  Lică Movilă
  Vlad Munteanu
  Lică Nunweiller
  Nicolae Oaidă
  Florin Petcu
  Cornel Popa
  Cristian Popovici
  Florin Prunea
  Narcis Răducan
  Răzvan Raț
  Vasile Simionaș
  Vasile Șoiman
  Costel Solomon
  Marian Tănasă
  Ion Țîrcovnicu
  Sorin Trofin
Moldova
  Alexei Scala
  Iurie Scala

Notable former managers

  Florian Ambru
  Gheorghe Constantin
  Nicolae Dumitru
  Florin Halagian
  Traian Ionescu
  Valeriu Neagu
  Mircea Nedelcu
  Angelo Niculescu
  Constantin Teașcă
  Costel Orac
  Gheorghe Poenaru
  Cristian Popovici
  Costică Rădulescu
  Andrei Sepci
  Nicolae Vătafu

References

External links
 
 
 

 
Defunct football clubs in Romania
Football clubs in Bacău County
Sport in Bacău
Association football clubs established in 1950
Association football clubs disestablished in 2020
Fan-owned football clubs
Liga I clubs
Liga II clubs
Liga III clubs
Liga IV clubs
1950 establishments in Romania
2020 disestablishments in Romania